Blanco River Remo is an extinct indigenous language once spoken in the Peruvian Amazon Basin, near the border with Brazil.

References

Indigenous languages of Western Amazonia
Panoan languages
Extinct languages of South America